Virginia Spencer Carr (July 21, 1929 – April 10, 2012) was a biographer of Carson McCullers, John Dos Passos and Paul Bowles. Carr was also a college professor for more than 25 years at Columbus State University in Columbus, Georgia, and Georgia State University in Atlanta.

Biography
Virginia Spencer Carr was born in West Palm Beach, Florida, on July 21, 1929. From the age of 12, she knew she wanted to someday be a writer.

Carr received her master's degree from the University of North Carolina at Chapel Hill and doctorate degree from Florida State University in 1969.

She was a professor of English at Columbus State University, until she agreed to chair the Department of English at Georgia State University in 1985.  In 1993, she was named the John B. and Elena Diaz Verson Amos Distinguished Professor in English Letters, a position she held until her retirement in 2003. She died of liver disease at her home in Lynn, Massachusetts, on April 10, 2012.

A collection of papers documenting Carr's research and correspondence for her biography of Carson McCullers is housed at the Rubenstein Library at Duke University.

Tennessee Williams
Carr first met Tennessee Williams in the early 1970s when she was in the preparatory stages of writing her biography on Carson McCullers, The Lonely Hunter.

Over the years, Carr and Williams met many times to discuss McCullers as well as other literary luminaries of his social circle.  As a result, a friendship ensued and Carr ultimately garnered the rights to write Williams' biography.

Williams said about his first meeting with Carr:

Paul Bowles
In the last ten years of Paul Bowles' life, Carr formed a friendship with the reclusive, expatriate writer and composer, whom she had first met in Morocco in 1989 to interview him for a biography on Tennessee Williams that she was drafting (never completed).

During her visit with Bowles, she asked him to sign a copy of a recently published biography on him, An Invisible Spectator, which prompted Bowles to state: "Does this book have anything to do with me?" As a result of this comment, and the later suggestion by Gore Vidal to postpone her work on Williams' biography and instead write one on Bowles, Carr shifted gears and began work on what would become Paul Bowles: A Life.
 
Bowles agreed to offer Carr his no-strings-attached cooperation on the work. The result - after 12 years, and 13 trips to visit him in Morocco, and arrangements she made for his medical treatment in Atlanta -  was that Bowles gave her in person and in letters tantalizing revelations about his life and the people with whom he had associated. It was understood by Carr that she could not publish any of this information until he had died.

She was able to read aloud to Bowles her completed work shortly before he died in 1999.

Awards, honors and distinctions
  Pulitzer Prize finalists for both The Lonely Hunter: A Biography of Carson McCullers and Dos Passos: A Life
 Senior Fulbright professor in Poland (1980–81)
 Southern Historical Association’s Francis Butler Simkins Prize (The Lonely Hunter: A Biography of Carson McCullers)
 Council of Authors and Journalist Nonfiction Prize (Dos Passos: A Life)
  John B. and Elena Diaz Verson Amos Distinguished Professor Emerita of English Letters at Georgia State University (1993–2003)
 South Atlantic Modern Language Association’s John Hurt Fisher Award (2004)
 Melon Fellowship recipient awarded by the Harry Ransom Humanities Research Center of the University of Texas at Austin
 Stanley J. Kahrl Fellowship awarded by Harvard University
 Georgia Governor's Award in the Humanities
 South Atlantic Modern Language Association's Honorary Member Award (2011)

Selected works

Biographies
 A Lonely Hunter: A Biography of Carson McCullers with a foreword by Tennessee Williams (University of Georgia Press, reprinted 2003)
 Dos Passos: A Life (New York: Doubleday, 1984)
 Paul Bowles: A Life (New York: Scribner, 2004; London: Peter Owen Publishers, 2005)

Other works
 Flowering Judas: Katherine Anne Porter (Women Writers: Text and Context), Editor (Rutgers University Press, 1993)
 Understanding Carson McCullers (University of South Carolina Press, reprinted 2005)

References

External links
Villanova University
New York Times obituary
Virginia Spencer Carr collection at Stuart A. Rose Manuscript, Archives, and Rare Books Library, Emory University
Materials about Virginia Spencer Carr in the Virginia Spencer Carr papers held by Special Collections, University of Delaware Library
Virginia Spencer Carr, 1929-2012: A Biographer’s Work (Archived) (online exhibition) at Special Collections, University of Delaware Library

American biographers
American women biographers
Florida State University alumni
University of North Carolina at Chapel Hill alumni
Harvard Fellows
Columbus State University faculty
Georgia State University faculty
1929 births
2012 deaths
People from West Palm Beach, Florida
American women academics
21st-century American women